These are the Canadian number-one country albums of 1996, per the RPM Country Albums chart.

1996
1996 record charts
1996 in Canadian music